By-elections to the 2nd Canadian Parliament were held to elect members of the House of Commons of Canada between the 1872 federal election and the 1874 federal election. The Conservative Party of Canada led a majority government for most of the 2nd Canadian Parliament.

The list includes Ministerial by-elections which occurred due to the requirement that Members of Parliament recontest their seats upon being appointed to Cabinet. These by-elections were almost always uncontested. This requirement was abolished in 1931.

See also
List of federal by-elections in Canada

Sources
 Parliament of Canada–Elected in By-Elections 

1873 elections in Canada
1872 elections in Canada
02nd